Jumaa is a surname. Notable people with the surname include:

Abdulrahim Jumaa (born 1979), United Arab Emirates footballer
Abdulsalaam Jumaa (born 1979), United Arab Emirati footballer
Ali Thani Jumaa (born 1968), footballer from UAE who played as an offensive midfielder
Badar Jumaa, (born 1981), Omani football goalkeeper

Jumaa may also refer to:
Jumu'ah (alternative transliteration), the Muslim Friday prayer